Traudl Weber is a West German para-alpine skier. She represented West Germany in alpine skiing at the 1976 Winter Paralympics.

She won the silver medal at the Women's Alpine Combination III event, the Women's Giant Slalom III event and the Women's Slalom III event. At each of these events Eva Lemezova, representing Czechoslovakia won the gold medal. There was also no bronze medal awarded at each of these events.

See also 
 List of Paralympic medalists in alpine skiing

References 

Living people
Year of birth missing (living people)
Place of birth missing (living people)
Paralympic alpine skiers of Germany
Alpine skiers at the 1976 Winter Paralympics
Medalists at the 1976 Winter Paralympics
Paralympic silver medalists for West Germany
Paralympic medalists in alpine skiing